Oh! My God is a 2006 South Korean film.

Plot 
Eun-joo develops a crush on playboy Jung-hwan after he rescues her from drowning, and vows to make him her man. One thing leads to another, and they end up having a one-night stand. Several years later, Jung-hwan is still living the high life while Eun-joo is working as a prosecutor. When they eventually cross paths, she reveals that he is the father of her twin children, and tries to make him grow up and take responsibility.

Cast 
 Choi Sung-kook as Jung-hwan
 Shin Yi as Eun-joo
 Park Won-sook as Jung-hwan's mother
 Kim Kwang-kyu as Secretary Shin
 Baek Il-seob
 Park Jun-gyu
 Ha Ji-young as Supporting
 Kim Soo-mi as (cameo)
 Lee Won-jong as (cameo)
 Jo Sang-gi

Release 
Oh! My God was released in South Korea on 16 February 2006, and topped the box office on its opening weekend with 373,861 admissions. The film went on to receive a total of 1,858,668 admissions nationwide.

See also 
 List of South Korean films of 2006

References

External links 
 
 
 

2006 films
2000s Korean-language films
South Korean action comedy films
2000s South Korean films